Martina Hingis was the defending champion but lost in the semifinals to Mary Pierce.

Lindsay Davenport won in the final 6–3, 6–1 against Pierce.

Seeds
A champion seed is indicated in bold text while text in italics indicates the round in which that seed was eliminated. The top four seeds received a bye to the second round.

  Martina Hingis (semifinals)
  Lindsay Davenport (champion)
  Venus Williams (quarterfinals)
  Monica Seles (semifinals)
  Conchita Martínez (second round)
  Steffi Graf (second round)
  Irina Spîrlea (first round)
  Nathalie Tauziat (quarterfinals)

Draw

Final

Section 1

Section 2

Qualifying

Qualifying seeds

Qualifiers

Qualifying draw

First qualifier

Second qualifier

Third qualifier

Fourth qualifier

External links
 1998 Toshiba Classic draw
 Main draw (WTA)

Southern California Open
1998 WTA Tour